Maximilian Zimmer (born 10 July 1992) is a retired German footballer who played as a midfielder.

Retirement
On 5 September 2019, 27-year old Zimmer announced that he would retire, after suffering from his third cruciate ligament rupture in January 2019.

References

External links
 Profile at DFB.de
 Profile at kicker.de
 

1992 births
Living people
Footballers from Berlin
German footballers
Germany youth international footballers
Association football midfielders
Hertha BSC II players
SV Babelsberg 03 players
1. FC Kaiserslautern II players
Berliner AK 07 players
FC Energie Cottbus players
3. Liga players
Regionalliga players